The Tunisia national rugby sevens team competes in the World Sevens Series and Rugby World Cup Sevens. They have been competing on and off at the Hong Kong Sevens, since 1989, which was their first time there.

At the Sevens World Series, Tunisia has collected 19 wins, 63 losses and 2 ties. Their most recent wins were against Argentina and Arabian Gulf at Dubai 2006; Australia, Scotland and Samoa at South Africa 2006; and France at Hong Kong 2008. The team resulted sixth at South Africa 2006 and seventh at South Africa 2004. Their last appearance at a World Series tournament was South Africa 2009. Tunisia played at the 2013 Sevens World Series qualifier at Hong Kong, where they won over Uruguay and lost to Tonga at the quarterfinals.

Tournament history

Rugby World Cup Sevens

Africa Cup Record

Players

Squad
Squad to the 2014 Hong Kong Sevens World Series Qualifier.

Haithem Chelli
Hossem Khalifa
Mohsen Essid
Ahmed Nwachri
Nejmeddine Khalifa
Chemseddine Khalifa
Chadi Jabri
Alaeddine Dhif
Ahmed Ben Hadj Khalifa
Issam Werhani
Mohamed Achref Dhif
Mohamed Gara Ali

See also
 World Sevens Series
 Rugby World Cup Sevens

References
 McLaren, Bill A Visit to Hong Kong in Starmer-Smith, Nigel & Robertson, Ian (eds) The Whitbread Rugby World '90 (Lennard Books, 1989)

National rugby sevens teams
Rugby union in Tunisia
Tunisia national rugby union team